Oughty Bridge railway station was a railway station on the Sheffield, Ashton-under-Lyne and Manchester Railway built to serve the village of Oughtibridge, Sheffield, South Yorkshire, England.

The station, which lies between Wadsley Bridge and Deepcar was opened on 14 July 1845 and closed on 15 June 1959. The old station house is a grade two listed building constructed from gritstone and has been used for industrial purposes for a number of years. In 2008 it was renovated and converted into a house. When the station was still in use, the goods sidings were used for carrying wood pulp to the nearby paper mill and also freight to and from the Oughtibridge silica works.

References

Disused railway stations in Sheffield
Woodhead Line
Railway stations in Great Britain opened in 1845
Railway stations in Great Britain closed in 1959
Grade II listed buildings in Sheffield
Former Great Central Railway stations
Oughtibridge